The 1989 British Speedway Under 21 Championship was the 21st staging of the Championship.  The event was won by Martin Dugard on his home track at Eastbourne.  The event also included race victories for eventual Speedway World Championship riders Chris Louis and Joe Screen.

Meeting Result 
 Eastbourne, England

National speedway championships
Brit
Brit